The Thomas Shiels House is located in Dallas, Texas.

It was added to the National Register of Historic Places in 1995 and listed for sale in April 2015.

See also

National Register of Historic Places listings in Dallas County, Texas
List of Dallas Landmarks

References

External links

National Register of Historic Places in Dallas
Houses in Dallas
Houses on the National Register of Historic Places in Texas
Dallas Landmarks